The Sportland Trophy (formerly Rozmaring Trophy) is an annual international figure skating competition held in Budapest, Hungary, usually in February or March. It is part of the European Criterium. Medals may be awarded in men's and ladies' singles on the senior, junior, novice, and other levels.

Senior medalists

Men

Ladies

Junior medalists

Men

Ladies

Advanced novice medalists

Men

Ladies

References

External links 
 European Criterium
 Sportorszag

International figure skating competitions hosted by Hungary